George Luttrell (12 Sep 1560 – Apr 1629) was an English politician from Dunster Castle in Somerset.  In 1582 and 1584 he sat in the House of Commons of England as a Member of Parliament (MP) for his family's pocket borough of Minehead.

He was the oldest son of Thomas Luttrell of Dunster Castle. His mother, Margaret, was a daughter of Christopher Hadley of Withycombe. His younger brother was John Luttrell.

He married  twice: Firstly, on 25 Sep 1580 to Joan Stukley, the younger daughter of his Ward, a "shady lawyer" named Hugh Stukley, of Marsh, Somerset. Secondly he married, at the age of 62 years, on 3 Oct 1622 a woman of relatively humble origins, named Sylvestra Capps, daughter of James Capps of Wiveliscombe, Devon; she outlived him by over 25 years and remarried twice. George Luttrell had a total of 5 sons and 9 daughters. His eldest son and heir by his first wife Joan was Thomas Luttrell (c. 1583–1644) q.v.

He was Sheriff of Somerset in 1593 and in 1609.

Progeny 
By his first wife, Joan Stukley, he had the following known children:

 Thomas Luttrell, heir to his father.
 Hugh Luttrell, of Rodhuish.
 George Luttrell, baptized at Dunster on the 12th of October 1590.  He matriculated at Lincoln College, Oxford, in 1608, and afterwards became a student of Gray's Inn.  He was buried at Dunster, on the 30th of December 1619.
 John Luttrell, baptized at Dunster on the 5th of January 1592.  He matriculated at Lincoln College, Oxford, in 1608.  He was living in 1620.
 Andrew Luttrell, baptized at Dunster on the 6th of une 1596 and was buried there four days later.
 Margaret Luttrell, baptized at East Quantockshead on the 11th of October 1584.  She married at Dunster, on the 3rd of August 1607, John Trevelyan of Nettlecombe.
 Catherine Luttrell, baptized at Dunster on the 18th of April 1589.  She married there, on the 4th of August 1607, the morrow of her sister's wedding, Lewis Pyne of East Down, in Devonshire.
 Elizabeth Luttrell, baptized at Dunster on the 23rd of March 1593, and buried there on the 21st of May 1595.
 Susan Luttrell, baptized at Dunster on the 9th of October 1594.  She married there, on the 29th of June 1612, John Francis of Combe Florey.
 Elizabeth Luttrell, baptized at Dunster on the 3rd of October, 1598.  In March 1621-2, George Luttrell, her father, made a formal declartion that he was willing that she should have the sum of 1,400L. bequeathed to her by her mother Joan, provided that she did not marry a Popish Recusant or the son of a Popish Recusant, or any other without his own consent.  She nevertheless married, in that year, Thomas Arundel of Chideock in Dorset, a member of a noted Roman Catholic family.
 Sarah Luttrell, baptized at Dunster on the 3rd of April 1600.  She married at Dunster, on the 9th of February 1625, Edmund Bowyer of Beer near Cannington.  She was buried at Stockland, on the 17th of May 1664.
 Mary Luttrell, buried at Dunster on the 14th of March 1608.

See also 
 Feudal barony of Dunster

References 
 

1560 births
1629 deaths
George
English MPs 1584–1585
High Sheriffs of Somerset